Joan T. A. Gabel is an American academic administrator who is the president of the University of Minnesota.

Early life and education 
Gabel was born in New York City and grew up in Atlanta. At age 16, Gabel entered Haverford College, where she earned a bachelor's degree in philosophy in 1988, then worked in employee benefits for two years. She earned a J.D. degree from the University of Georgia School of Law in 1993.

Career 
Gabel was briefly an associate attorney in Atlanta and served as editor-in-chief of the American Business Law Journal. She was a professor of legal studies at Georgia State University from 1996 to 2007, then was a professor of business law and department chair at Florida State University from 2007 to 2010. From 2010 to 2015, Gabel was the dean of the college of business at the University of Missouri and became the provost of the University of South Carolina in 2015. She was also selected for faculty/staff membership in Omicron Delta Kappa, the National Leadership Honor Society, while at the University of South Carolina. In 2019, University of Minnesota regents offered Gabel the presidency of the state's university system.

As president of the University of Minnesota, Gabel is the first woman to hold that position. Within her first year of being president, she helped guide the university during two major events: the COVID-19 pandemic and the police murder of George Floyd and subsequent protests. To combat the Covid-19 crisis in 2020, Gabel closed University of Minnesota campuses and shifted instruction to online learning. In response to Floyd's murder, she announced that the university would be reducing collaboration with the Minneapolis Police Department. Gabel joined a lawsuit against the U.S. federal government, fighting a potential rule that would have deported many international students.

References

Year of birth missing (living people)
Living people
University of South Carolina faculty
American women academics
Women heads of universities and colleges
Presidents of the University of Minnesota
Georgia State University faculty
Florida State University faculty
University of Missouri faculty
Haverford College alumni
University of Georgia alumni
21st-century American women